Harrya atriceps is a rare species of bolete fungus. Described as new to science in 2012, it is found in the Cordillera Talamanca of Costa Rica, where it grows in a mycorrhizal association with the oak species Quercus copeyensis and Quercus seemannii. Compared to its much more common and widespread relative, Harrya chromapes, H. atriceps has a black cap and lacks pinkish colors in its stipe scabers, but it does have a yellowish stipe base. Its smooth, fusoid spores measure 9.1–11.9 by 4.2–6.3 μm.

References

External links

Boletaceae
Fungi described in 2012
Fungi of Central America